Chuck Panama (February 2, 1925 – May 13, 2018) was an American journalist and publicist.

Early life
Panama was born on February 2, 1925, in Chicago. He served in the Pacific during World War II.

Panama graduated from the University of California, Los Angeles. He was the sports editor of the campus newspaper, the Daily Bruin.

Career
Panama began his career in journalism at the International News Service. He subsequently worked in public relations for Harry Brand at 20th Century Fox. He represented celebrities like Faye Dunaway, Elvis Priestley, Henry Fonda, and Elizabeth Taylor. He was a publicist for The Simpsons and M*A*S*H.

Panama received the Les Mason Award from the International Cinematographers Guild in 1990.

Personal life and death
With his wife Gerry, Panama had a son and two daughters.

Panama died on May 13, 2018, at the Motion Picture & Television Country House and Hospital in Woodland Hills, Los Angeles. He was 93.

References

1925 births
2018 deaths
People from Chicago
People from Los Angeles
University of California, Los Angeles alumni
American publicists